The Ness-class combat stores ship were a class of three Combat stores ships built by Swan Hunter for the Royal Navy's Fleet Auxiliary in the mid-1960s.  They were purchased by the United States Navy in the mid-1980s and renamed Sirius-class.  They were operated by Military Sealift Command for the US Navy until the late 2000s when they were deactivated.

References

Cold War auxiliary ships of the United States
Cold War fleet auxiliaries of the United Kingdom

Ship classes of the Royal Navy
Auxiliary ship classes of the United States Navy